The 2017 Summer Deaflympics, officially known as the 23rd Summer Deaflympics, is an international multi-sport event that took place in Samsun, Turkey from July 18 to July 30, 2017. 3,148 athletes from 97 countries competed in 18 sports with 21 disciplines. 86 records were broken with 54 being world records and 32 being Deaflympics records.

Sports 
2017 Summer Deaflympics offered 18 Sports including Golf which made its debut.

 
 
 
 
 
Mountain biking (2)
Road (8)
 
 
 
 
 
 
 
 
 
 
 
 
Indoor volleyball (2)
Beach volleyball (2)
 
Freestyle (8)
Greco-Roman (8)

Venues
The largest venue at the games in terms of seating capacity was the 33,919 -seat Samsun 19 Mayıs Stadium, which served as the ceremonies venue.

Participating  National Deaf Sports Associations
A total of 97 National Deaf Sports Associations from all over the world participated in the Games. This was the highest number of nations in any edition before. Afghanistan, Cameroon, Ivory Coast, Mali made their debut at the games.

Logo

The logo of the games is a combination of the elements of The Olympic Games, the Olympic flame, deaf communication, Samsun Pheasant Bird, Turkish Tulip, Peace and Friendship.

Mascot
The official mascot of the 2017 Summer Deaflympics was unveiled on June 13, 2017. It represents a local male resident wearing regional outfit. The name of the mascot was chosen as "Çakır" (literally "greyish blue") following a voting on the official website of the Deaflympics.

Torch relay
The Deaflympic Torch was brought from Lausanne, Switzerland to Batı Park in Samsun by the Turkish Olympic champion in wrestling, Taha Akgül. The torch relay began with lighting of the torches of the Turkish sportspeople as "Olympic ambassadors", the footballers Gökhan Gönül and Sabri Sarıoğlu, world-record holder female diver Şahika Ercümen and television host Ece Vahapoğlu. Led by the Minister of Youth and Sports Akif Çağatay Kılıç, they marched to the Mustafa Dağıstanlı Sports Hall, where the torch was handed over to the mayor of the Samsun Metropolitan Municipality, Yusuf Ziya Yılmaz.

Calendar

Medals
This is the table of the medal count of the 2017 Summer Deaflympics, based on the medal count of the International Olympic Committee (IOC). These rankings sort by the number of gold medals, earned by a National Deaf Sports Association (NDSA). The number of silver medals is taken into consideration next and then the number of bronze medals. If, after the above, countries are still tied, equal ranking is given and they are listed alphabetically by IOC Country Code. Although this information is provided by the IOC, the CISS itself does not recognize or endorse any ranking system.

Final medal table:

References

External links
Official website 

 
2017 Summer
2017 in multi-sport events
International sports competitions hosted by Turkey
2017
2017
2017 in Turkish sport
Multi-sport events in Turkey
July 2017 sports events in Europe